Antonio Spavone (born 2 June 1994) is an Italian racing driver and entrepreneur.

Career

Karting
Spavone was born in Naples.  He began karting in 2005 and raced primarily in his native Italy for the majority of this part of career, working his way up from the junior ranks to progress through to the KF2 category by 2010.

Formula Abarth
In 2010, Spavone graduated to single–seaters into the newly launched Formula Abarth series in Italy, stating with Alan Racing, debuting at Vallelunga with three rounds to spare. His best result was a finish in fourteenth place at Mugello that brought him 31st place in the series standings. Spavone stayed in Formula Abarth for a second season in 2011 but switched to debutants JD Motorsport, when the series split in European and Italian series. He had six-pointscoring finishes in Italian and four in European Series and finally finished thirteenth and fourteenth respectively.

Auto GP World Series
In 2012 Spavone joined Euronova Racing for his debut in Auto GP World Series.

GP3 Series
As well as Auto GP competing Spavone also will race for Trident Racing in GP3 Series.

Racing record

Career summary

Complete Auto GP results
(key) (Races in bold indicate pole position) (Races in italics indicate fastest lap)

Complete GP3 Series results
(key) (Races in bold indicate pole position) (Races in italics indicate fastest lap)

References

External links
 
 

1994 births
Living people
Racing drivers from Naples
Italian racing drivers
Formula Abarth drivers
Auto GP drivers
Formula Masters China drivers
Italian GP3 Series drivers
International GT Open drivers
Ombra Racing drivers
JD Motorsport drivers
Euronova Racing drivers
Trident Racing drivers
Super Nova Racing drivers
GT4 European Series drivers